The Polynesian wattled honeyeater (Foulehaio carunculatus) or the eastern wattled honeyeater, is a species of bird in the honeyeater family Meliphagidae. It was considered conspecific with the Fiji wattled honeyeater and the kikau.

The species is endemic to the islands of the Central Pacific, occurring on American Samoa, Fiji, Samoa, Tonga, and Wallis and Futuna Islands.
Its natural habitats are tropical moist lowland forests, tropical mangrove forests, and tropical moist montane forest.

References

Polynesian wattled honeyeater
Birds of Polynesia
Birds of Tonga
Birds of Fiji
Birds of Samoa
Polynesian wattled honeyeater
Taxa named by Johann Friedrich Gmelin
Taxonomy articles created by Polbot